The 1991 FIBA European Champions Cup Final Four was the 1990–91 season's FIBA European Champions Cup Final Four tournament, organized by FIBA Europe.

POP 84 won its third title in a row, after defeating FC Barcelona Banca Catalana in the final game.

Bracket

Semifinals

FC Barcelona Banca Catalana – Maccabi Elite Tel Aviv

POP 84 – Scavolini Pesaro

Third place game

Final

Awards

FIBA European Champions Cup Final Four MVP 
  Toni Kukoč ( POP 84)

FIBA European Champions Cup Finals Top Scorer 
  Zoran Savić ( POP 84)

FIBA European Champions Cup All-Final Four Team

References

External links 
 1990–91 EuroLeague at FIBAEurope.com
 Linguasport

1990–91 in European basketball
1990–91
1990–91 in Israeli basketball
1990–91 in Spanish basketball
1990–91 in Italian basketball
1990–91 in Yugoslav basketball
1990–91 in French basketball
International basketball competitions hosted by France
International sports competitions hosted by Paris
1991 in Paris
Basketball in Paris